Bankesia is a genus of moths of the Psychidae family.

Species
Bankesia douglasii (Stainton, 1854)
Bankesia conspurcatella (Zeller, 1850)
Bankesia defoliella (Constant, 1895)
Bankesia deplatsella Nel, 1999
Bankesia montanella (Walsingham, 1899)
Bankesia pallida (Staudinger, 1879)

External links
Bankesia at funet

Psychidae
Psychidae genera